Lomatium laevigatum, commonly known as slickrock biscuitroot, is a perennial herb of the Apiaceae family. It grows in basalt cliffs east of the Cascades crest in south-central Washington to Oregon. Its range is limited and considered threatened in Washington State.

References

laevigatum
Flora of the Northwestern United States
Endemic flora of the United States
Taxa named by John Merle Coulter
Flora without expected TNC conservation status